The 2016–17 Louisiana–Lafayette Ragin' Cajuns women's basketball team represented the University of Louisiana at Lafayette during the 2016–17 NCAA Division I women's basketball season. The Ragin' Cajuns were led by fifth-year head coach Garry Brodhead and played all home games at the Cajundome with a select few at Blackham Coliseum during the Cajundome renovations towards the beginning of the season, the first games played there in thirty years. This is also one of the first years that women's basketball does not play at Earl K. Long Gymnasium, their previous on-campus home, at any time during the season They were members in the Sun Belt Conference. They finished the season 20-11, 11–7 in Sun Belt play to finish in fourth place. They advanced to the championship game of the Sun Belt women's tournament where they lost to Troy by the score of 64-78. They did not compete in any other postseason tournaments.

Previous season 
The Ragin' Cajuns finished the 2016–17 season 25-10, 13–7 in Sun Belt play to finish third in the conference. They made it to the 2016 Sun Belt Conference Women's Basketball semifinal game after defeating UT Arlington in the first round game before losing to Little Rock in the semifinals. They would continue to be invited to the Women's Basketball Invitational for the second time in two years after previously winning the Championship, and would eventually be crowned National Champions again in the WBI after defeating Northwestern State, Stetson, Youngstown State, and Weber State in the First Round, Second Round, Semifinals, and Championship Game, respectively.

Roster

Schedule and results

|-
!colspan=9 style=| Exhibition

|-
!colspan=9 style=| Non-conference regular season

|-
!colspan=9 style=| Exhibition

|-
!colspan=9 style=| Non-conference regular season

|-
!colspan=9 style=| Sun Belt regular season

|-
!colspan=9 style=| Sun Belt Women's Tournament

See also
 2016–17 Louisiana–Lafayette Ragin' Cajuns men's basketball team

References

Louisiana Ragin' Cajuns women's basketball seasons
Louisiana-Lafayette
Louisiana
Louisiana